The Portuguese Basketball Champions Tournament was a competition for Portuguese teams that play in the Portuguese Basketball League (LCB).

Qualifying

Group A
Played in Casino Ginásio pavilion

Group B
Played in CF Belenenses pavilion

Final phase
Played in Portalegre

Ovarense and FC Porto automatic qualified as LCB Champion and Portuguese Cup Winner.

MVP:  Shawn Jackson - Ovarense

Portuguese Basketball Champions Tournament
2006–07 in Portuguese basketball